Timbo is an unincorporated community in Stone County, Arkansas, United States.  It is in the Ozark Mountains region of the northern part of the state and is near the town of Mountain View.

Timbo is known particularly for its strong tradition of old-time music.  Music legend Jimmy Driftwood lived there. In 1959, Alan Lomax recorded music in Timbo (as well as in Heber Springs, Hughes, and Landis).

Timbo's ZIP code is 72680, although it previously used the ZIP code 72657, which was formerly served by the small post office at nearby Newnata (which is no longer in operation).

Education 
Public education is provided by Timbo Elementary School and Timbo High School, which are in the Mountain View School District.

Timbo and its schools were previously a part of the Stone County School District. On July 1, 2004, it consolidated with Rural Special School District into the existing Mountain View School District.

References

Unincorporated communities in Stone County, Arkansas
Unincorporated communities in Arkansas